In mathematics, a cardinal function (or cardinal invariant) is a function that returns cardinal numbers.

Cardinal functions in set theory 

 The most frequently used cardinal function is a function that assigns to a set A its cardinality, denoted by | A |.
 Aleph numbers and beth numbers can both be seen as cardinal functions defined on ordinal numbers.
 Cardinal arithmetic operations are examples of functions from cardinal numbers (or pairs of them) to cardinal numbers.
 Cardinal characteristics of a (proper) ideal I of subsets of X are:

The "additivity" of I is the smallest number of sets from I whose union is not in I any more. As any ideal is closed under finite unions, this number is always at least ; if I is a σ-ideal, then 

 The "covering number" of I is the smallest number of sets from I whose union is all of X. As X itself is not in I, we must have add(I) ≤ cov(I).

 The "uniformity number" of I (sometimes also written ) is the size of the smallest set not in I. Assuming I contains all singletons, add(I) ≤ non(I).

 The "cofinality" of I is the cofinality of the partial order (I, ⊆). It is easy to see that we must have non(I) ≤ cof(I) and cov(I) ≤ cof(I).

In the case that  is an ideal closely related to the structure of the reals, such as the ideal of Lebesgue null sets or the ideal of meagre sets, these cardinal invariants are referred to as cardinal characteristics of the continuum.

 For a preordered set  the bounding number  and dominating number  are defined as

 In PCF theory the cardinal function  is used.

Cardinal functions in topology 

Cardinal functions are widely used in topology as a tool for describing various topological properties. Below are some examples.  (Note: some authors, arguing that "there are no finite cardinal numbers in general topology", prefer to define the cardinal functions listed below so that they never taken on finite cardinal numbers as values; this requires modifying some of the definitions given below, for example by adding "" to the right-hand side of the definitions, etc.)

 The weight  of a topological space  is the cardinality of the smallest base for   When  the space  is said to be second countable.
 The character of a topological space  at a point  is the cardinality of the smallest local base for   The character of space  is   When  the space  is said to be first countable.
 The density  of a space  is the cardinality of the smallest dense subset of   When  the space  is said to be separable.
 The Lindelöf number  of a space  is the smallest infinite cardinality such that every open cover has a subcover of cardinality no more than  When  the space  is said to be a Lindelöf space.
 The cellularity or Suslin number of a space  is
  is a family of mutually disjoint non-empty open subsets of  
 The hereditary cellularity (sometimes called spread) is the least upper bound of cellularities of its subsets:  or  where "discrete" means that it is a discrete topological space.
 The extent of a space  is  So  has countable extent exactly when it has no uncountable closed discrete subset. 

Basic inequalities

Cardinal functions in Boolean algebras

Cardinal functions are often used in the study of Boolean algebras. We can mention, for example, the following functions:

Length  of a Boolean algebra  is
 is a chain 
Depth  of a Boolean algebra  is
 is a well-ordered subset .
Incomparability  of a Boolean algebra  is
 such that .
Pseudo-weight   of a Boolean algebra  is
 such that

Cardinal functions in algebra

Examples of cardinal functions in algebra are:
Index of a subgroup H of G is the number of cosets.
Dimension of a vector space V over a field K is the cardinality of any Hamel basis of V.
More generally, for a free module M over a ring R we define rank  as the cardinality of any basis of this module.
For a linear subspace W of a vector space V we define codimension of W (with respect to V).
For any algebraic structure it is possible to consider the minimal cardinality of generators of the structure.
For algebraic extensions, algebraic degree and separable degree are often employed (note that the algebraic degree equals the dimension of the extension as a vector space over the smaller field).
For non-algebraic field extensions, transcendence degree is likewise used.

External links
 A Glossary of Definitions from General Topology

See also
 Cichoń's diagram

References 

 

Function
Types of functions